Deojhar railway station is a railway station on the South Eastern Railway network in the state of Odisha, India. It serves Deojhar village. Its code is DJHR. It has two platforms. Express trains halt at Deojhar railway station.

Major Trains

 Puri - Barbil Express

References

See also
 Kendujhar district

Railway stations in Kendujhar district
Chakradharpur railway division